Michael Alexander Alvarez Pamular, better known by his stage name Josh Santana (born 18 June 1983), is a Filipino former television actor and singer.

Early life
Santana was born on 18 June 1983 in Metro Manila, Philippines to Spanish-Filipino parents Ramón Delgado Pamular (judge) and Sonia Magno Álvarez. He rose to popularity in 2003 as the male love interest of Carol Banawa in the TV series Bituin. It was from the character he played in Bituin where he took the name Josh Santana.

Beginnings
Josh Santana obtained his college degree at the Far Eastern University (FEU), Manila. He represented his university in an International student Congress held in Kuala Lumpur, Malaysia in 2005 and in 2006, was elected as the President of the FEU-Central Student Council. He graduated in 2007 and named with 12 others as an Outstanding Senior Student out of 6000 FEU graduates of 2007.

After his graduation, he was named Dangal ng Kabataan awardee (or Honor to the Youth) by the Pampelikulang Samahan ng mga Dalub-guro.

Acting
In Bituin, Josh Santana plays the role of a very popular Filipino actor-singer from whom Melody Sandoval (played by Carol Banawa) seeks help in launching her singing career. However, he despises her having come from a poor provincial family.

Upon realising the truth about his dwindling singing career, after his fans found out that he had a son, who was kept away from media exposure, died in an accident, he was left with only one option, to accept the offer to have Melody as a guest in his concert.

By then, Melody has already become a more popular personality. The world turns around, and this time it is Josh who needs help from Melody, who sings with a crystal clear and angelic voice. They both get a chance to work with each other and eventually fall in love.

Bituin soon ended following the rumours that its senior lead character Nora Aunor refused to comply with the agreement specified in her contract signed with ABS-CBN Star Cinema.

Singing
After Bituin, Santana focused on his singing career and eventually he was given another shot when he recorded the theme song of Basta't Kasama Kita, followed by a translation of Qing Fei Di Yi to Can't Help Fallin' Into You for the theme song of Meteor Garden, the popular song was originally sung by Taiwanese pop singer Harlem Yu.

Josh left show business after he released the theme song of the teen-oriented TV programme Qpids titled Dito sa Puso ko, where he featured the then new discovery Nikki Gil.

Discography

Josh Santana
In 2004, Santana released a 10-track self-tiled album  
The album is described as "Original" containing: 
"Hindi Ko Kaya" (Lyrics & Music by: Aaron Paul Del Rosario/Arranged by: Paolo Zarate)
"Muli" (Lyrics & Music by: Rhoen Del Monte & Romwell/Arranged by: Paolo Zarate)
"Mahal Na Mahal Ko Siya" (Lyrics & Music by: Gary Valenciano/Arranged by: Paolo Zarate)
"Nasaan Ka?" (Lyrics & Music by: Jonathan Manalo/Arranged by: Paolo Zarate)
"Maibabalik Ko Ba?" (Lyrics & Music by: Marc Bryan R. Adona/Arranged by: Paolo Zarate)
"Mahal Naman Kita" (Lyrics & Music by: Marizen Yaneza/Arranged by: Gino "Blooze" Cruz)
"Can't Help Fallin' Into You or "Biyahe" (Tagalog Adaptation) (Lyrics & Music by: Chang Keat Siong/Arranged by: Jun Tamayo)
"Pagkat Sa Pangarap (Lyrics & Music by: Larry Hermoso/Arranged by: Elmer Blancaflor)
"Ikaw Lang Pala" (Lyrics & Music by: Joanthan Florido/Arranged by: Arnold Cabalza)
"Journey Of A Smile" (Lyrics & Music by: Markel Luna/Arranged by: Paolo Zarate)
Note: Some of his songs were compiled with Divo Bayer's and King's songs into an album titled Solo.

Josh Santana: Eres Tú
In March 2009, Santana released a 10-track album entitled Josh Santana: Eres Tú.

The album is described as "Fil-Hispano", containing:
Three original songs:
"Kahit Minsan Lang" (composed by Marlon Silva)
"Magpakailanman" (composed Marlon Silva)
"Estar Contigo" (composed by Josh Santana himself)
Covers / interpretation:
"Historia de un Amor" (all Spanish)
"Eres Tú" (all Spanish)
"Hate That I Love You" (Spanish/English)
"Eres Mío" (Spanish/Tagalog)"
"Dreaming of You" (in cover, originally by Selena)
"I Don't Wanna Lose You Now (in cover, originally by Gloria Estefan)
An alternative version of the all-time Spanish favorite "Eres Tu"

The album was produced by Zachary Cordero Barlahan and Dennis García Arce.

Filmography

Television
 ASAP Natin 'To as Himself/Performer (ABS-CBN; 2002–2006)

References

External links
Josh Santana MySpace website

Star Magic
1983 births
Living people
Filipino male television actors
21st-century Filipino male singers
Filipino pop singers
Singers from Metro Manila
Male actors from Metro Manila
Far Eastern University alumni